Xixiping Subdistrict is a subdistrict and the seat of Yongding District in Zhangjiajie Prefecture-level City, Hunan, China. The subdistrict was reformed through the amalgamation of six villages of Sancha Township and the former Yongding Subdistrict on November 27, 2015. Its seat is Xixiping Community.

History
Xixiping was a part of the former Dongping Township in 1949. Xixiping Commune was formed in 1958 and reorganized as a township in 1984. The township was reorganized as a subdistrict in 1985. 11 villages of the former Guanmenyan Township and three villages of the former Tianmenshan Township were merged to it in 1995. On November 27, 2015, six villages of the former Sancha Township were amalgamated to the subdistrict.

See also 
 List of township-level divisions of Hunan

References

Yongding District
Towns of Hunan
County seats in Hunan